Morane-Saulnier MoS-50 (also MS.50) was a French parasol configuration
trainer aircraft built in 1924. The twin-seat aircraft was of wooden construction and was one of the last aircraft to have a rotary engine, a  Clerget 9B.

In 1925 six MS.50Cs were sold to Finland, where they were used as trainers until 1932. It was very popular in service. Five aircraft of the modified  MS.53 type were sold to Turkey.

Versions

 Morane-Saulier M.S.50
 Three seat prototype, powered by a  Salmson AC9 9-cylinder radial engine.
 M.S.50C 
 Two-seat primary trainer aircraft powered by a  Clerget 9B rotary engine.
M.S.51
 Powered by a  Hispano-Suiza 8ab V-8 cylinder piston engine. Only three were built.
M.S.53
 Improved version of M.S.51, with same engine.
M.S.120
M.S.53 with a  Salmson engine.

Survivors
The only preserved aircraft of this type is at the Aviation Museum of Central Finland.

Operators
 French Air Force
 Finnish Air Force
 Turkish Air Force

Specifications (MS 50C)

See also

References

Further reading

1920s French military trainer aircraft
Parasol-wing aircraft
Single-engined tractor aircraft
Aircraft first flown in 1924
Morane-Saulnier aircraft
Rotary-engined aircraft